Kirpal Singh batth (born; 19 May 1992) in Punjab, India is an Indian discus thrower.

Discus thrower Kirpal Singh Batth has seen his career getting waylaid by injuries.

 Kirpal is a self-coached discus thrower, relying on YouTube for videos of top throwers in the world, and recording clips of himself to self-analyse.   He said that "I'm also my own coach. It's difficult to coach yourself. But, you know, now you have smartphones, and you get to watch a lot of videos. I shoot clips of myself throwing and then rewatch them to spot errors. It's okay. Everything is good. Life's good," chuckled Kirpal as he walked off.

Career 
Batth broke the national record at the 2022 Federation Cup Senior Athletics Championships and won a gold medal. His best throw was 61.83 meters.

He also won gold medals in 2019 at the South Asian Games in Katmandu with a throw of 57.88 meters and at the National Open Athletics in Hanamkonda, Telangana with a throw of 59.58 meters.

References 

1992 births
Living people
Indian male discus throwers